Smionia is a genus of African ground spiders that was first described by R. de Dalmas in 1920.  it contains only two species: S. capensis and S. lineatipes.

References

Araneomorphae genera
Gnaphosidae
Spiders of South Africa